The following lists events that happened during 2000 in Russia.

Incumbents
 President: Vladimir Putin (from May 7, acting President until May 7) 
 Prime Minister: Vladimir Putin (until May 7), Mikhail Kasyanov (from May 7)

Events

February
 February 4 - Second Chechen War: Bombing of Katyr-Yurt. 
 February 5 - Second Chechen War: Novye Aldi massacre. 
 February 6 - Second Chechen War: Battle of Grozny, Chechen capital Grozny falls to Russian troops.
 February 29–March 1 - Second Chechen War: Battle of Hill 776.

March
 March - Second Chechen War: Komsomolskoye massacre. 
 March 1 - Second Chechen War: Grozny OMON fratricide incident. 
 March 4–March 25 - Second Chechen War: Battle of Komsomolskoye.
 March 26 - Presidential elections: Vladimir Putin is elected president.
 March 29 - Second Chechen War: Zhani-Vedeno ambush.

May
 May 24 - The Russian Government threatens to bomb the Taliban in Afghanistan due to their support for Chechen rebels.

July
 July 2–July 3 - Second Chechen War: Chechen suicide attacks kill 43 Russian soldiers.

August
 August 12 - The Russian submarine K-141 Kursk sinks in the Barents Sea, resulting in the deaths of all 118 men on board.
 August 14 - Tsar Nicholas II and several members of his family are canonized by the synod of the Russian Orthodox Church.
 August 28 - Moscow's Ostankino Tower set ablaze by fire caused by a short circuit.

September
 September 15–October 1 - Russia competes at the Summer Olympics in Sydney, Australia, winning 32 gold, 28 silver and 29 bronze medals.

December
 December 25 - Russia changes their national anthem back to the old Soviet Union anthem, with newer lyrics.

Notable births
 January 1 – Ekaterina Alexandrovskaya, Russian-Australian pair skater (d. 2020)
 January 26 - Angélique Abachkina, ice dancer
 February 9 - Serafima Sakhanovich, figure skater
 April 12 - Maria Sotskova, figure skater
 November 8 - Anastasia Skoptsova, ice dancer

Notable deaths

 January 6 - Alexey Vyzmanavin, Chess grandmaster (born 1960)
 January 7 – Makhmud Esambayev, Soviet and Russian actor and dancer (born 1924)
 February 20 - Anatoly Sobchak, politician (born 1937)
 February 29 - Nikita Moiseyev, mathematician (born 1917)
 March 9 - Artyom Borovik, journalist and media magnate (born 1960)
 March - William Pokhlyobkin, writer (born 1923)
 April 19 - Sergey Pavlovich Zalygin, writer (born 1913)
 May 19 - Yevgeny Khrunov, cosmonaut (born 1933)
 May 24 - Oleg Yefremov, actor (born 1927)
 June 2 - Svyatoslav Fyodorov, ophthalmologist and politician (born 1927)
 July 24 - Anatoli Firsov, ice hockey player (born 1941)
 August 1 - Galina Sergeyeva, actress (born 1914)
 November 20 - Nikolay Dollezhal, engineer (born 1899)
Date unknown
 David Klyshko, physicist (born 1929)
 Jurij A. Treguboff, Soviet author (born 1913)

See also
List of Russian films of 2000

References

External links

 
Russia
2000s in Russia
Russia
Years of the 20th century in Russia